NGC 2188 is a barred spiral galaxy in the constellation Columba. It is located at a distance of circa 25 million light years from Earth, which means that the galaxy, given its apparent dimensions is about 50.000 light years long. It was discovered by John Herschel on January 9, 1836.

NGC 2188 is a spiral galaxy seen edge-on from the viewpoint of Earth as the centre and spiral arms of the galaxy are tilted away from us, with only the very narrow outer edge of the galaxy's disc visible to us. The true shape of the galaxy was identified by studying the distribution of the stars in the inner central bulge and outer disc and by observing the stars' colours. The galaxy is close enough that its stars can be resolved. The brightest of them have an apparent magnitude of about 21. 

When imaged in HI, the galaxy appears asymmetrical, maybe due to a recent interaction. The hydrogen gas is more abundant in one end of the galaxy and extends over 4 kpc away from the galactic plane. Other features visible are some filaments and a superbubble with a diameter of 15 arcseconds. The filaments have been associated with a HII region located in the galactic halo. The total hydrogen mass of the galaxy is estimated to be , while it is of low metallicity.

NGC 2188 has been found to have three smaller companions, HIPASS J0607-34, ESO364-029, and KK 55.

References

External links 

Barred spiral galaxies
Dwarf spiral galaxies
Columba (constellation)
2188
18536